Remo North is a Local Government Area in Ogun State, Nigeria.

It has an area of 199 km and a population of 59,911 at the 2006 census.
 
The postal code of the area is 121.

References

Local Government Areas in Ogun State